Rastko Stojković (born 12 July 1981) is a Serbian handball player who plays for Pfadi Winterthur.

Club career
Over the course of his career that spanned over two decades, Stojković played for Partizan, Studentski grad, Borac Banja Luka, PKB, Crvena zvezda, VfL Pfullingen, HSG Nordhorn, Vive Kielce, Al Rayyan, Meshkov Brest, Maccabi Rishon LeZion, Rekreativo, and Vojvodina.

International career
At international level, Stojković represented Serbia in three major tournaments, winning the silver medal at the 2012 European Championship.

Honours
Crvena zvezda
 Serbia and Montenegro Handball Super League: 2003–04
 Serbia and Montenegro Handball Cup: 2003–04
HSG Nordhorn
 EHF Cup: 2007–08

References

External links

 

1981 births
Living people
Handball players from Belgrade
Serbian male handball players
RK Partizan players
RK Borac Banja Luka players
RK Crvena zvezda players
Vive Kielce players
RK Vojvodina players
Handball-Bundesliga players
Expatriate handball players
Serbian expatriate sportspeople in Germany
Serbian expatriate sportspeople in Poland
Serbian expatriate sportspeople in Belarus
Serbian expatriate sportspeople in Israel